Terzioğlu is a Turkish surname. It is an occupational surname of patronymic derivation:   (tailor) +  (son of)

Notable people with the surname include:

 Burçin Terzioğlu (born 1980), Turkish actress
 Merve Terzioğlu (1987–2008), Turkish swimmer
 Nazım Terzioglu (1912–1976), Turkish mathematician
 Tosun Terzioğlu (1942−2016), Turkish mathematician

See also
 Terzi
 Terzis

Turkish-language surnames
Patronymic surnames
Occupational surnames